Uzquiano is a village in the Enclave of Treviño of the province of Burgos, Spain.

The parish church is a small but notable example of late Romanesque architecture.

Municipalities in the Province of Burgos